Rupnath Brahma  (Bodo: रुपनाथ ब्रह्म 1902-1968) was a Bodo poet, politician and religious scholar.
He was born on 15 June 1902 at Owabari village of Kokrajhar district. He was the son of Dhajendra Brahma and Khwdwmsri Brahma. He breathed his last on 23 January 1968.
He is credited with helping establish Brahma Dharma. His poems were mostly mystic in character. He was also first minister from the Bodos. The Inter-State Bus Terminal of Guwahati is named after him to commemorate him as Rupnath Brahma Inter-State Bus Terminal.

References

.

Hindu poets
Bodo people
People from Kokrajhar district
Tribal people from Assam
1902 births
1968 deaths
20th-century Indian poets
Indian male poets
Poets from Assam
20th-century Indian male writers